Stanley de la Courtte Snooke (11 November 1878 – 6 April 1959) was a South African cricketer who played in one Test match in 1907.

His brother, Tip, also played Test cricket for South Africa.

1878 births
1959 deaths
South Africa Test cricketers
South African cricketers
Gauteng cricketers
Western Province cricketers